The Hingis–S. Williams rivalry was a tennis rivalry between Martina Hingis and Serena Williams, who met 13 times between 1998 and 2002. Their head-to-head is 7–6, in Williams' favor. They turned pro within a year of each other, Hingis in October 1994 and Serena in September 1995.

Head-to-head

Singles

Martina Hingis–Serena Williams (6–7)

Doubles

Martina Hingis–Serena Williams (2–2)

Exhibitions

Singles

Martina Hingis–Serena Williams (1–1)

Doubles

Martina Hingis–Serena Williams (0–2)

Mixed doubles

Martina Hingis–Serena Williams (1–1)

Breakdown of the rivalry
Hard courts: Williams, 7–5
Clay courts: Hingis, 1–0
Grass courts: None
Carpet: None
Grand Slam matches: Williams, 2–1
Grand Slam finals: Williams, 1–0
Year-End Championships matches: None
Year-End Championships finals: None
Fed Cup matches: None
All finals: Tied, 1–1

See also
List of tennis rivalries

References

Tennis rivalries
Sports rivalries in the United States